

Teams

Venue

Background

Route to the final

Note: In all results below, the score of the finalist is given first.(H: home, A: away)

Match

Details

Statistics

See also
 2020–21 Svenska Cupen

References

2021
Cup
Hammarby Fotboll matches
BK Häcken matches
May 2021 sports events in Sweden
Sports competitions in Stockholm